This is a list of cities in Chile.

A city is defined by Chile's National Statistics Institute (INE) as an "urban entity" with more than 5,000 inhabitants. This list is based on a June 2005 report by the INE based on the 2002 census which registered 239 cities across the country.

Complete list of cities by region

Largest urban agglomerations
This list includes conurbations, "absorptions" and cities with over 100,000 inhabitants, according to the 2017 census.

See also
List of towns in Chile
Communes of Chile

Notes

References

Further reading

External links
National Statistics Institute (INE)

Cities
Chile, cities in
Chile
Chile
 Cities